Nadezhda Morozova née Nadezjda Sidelnik (Надежда Морозова; born September 1998) is a Kazakhstani long track speed skater.

Career
Morozova participated in the 2020 World Single Distance Speed Skating Championships, in the 1500 metres event and 5000 metres event, and at the 2020 World Allround Speed Skating Championships, finishing 18th overall. She won two silver medals at the 2020 Four Continents Speed Skating Championships. She also competes at other international competitions, including at ISU Speed Skating World Cups. At the 2022 Winter Olympics, she finished 14th in the 1500 metres.

As of 2020 she had been national champion six times.

Records

National records 

 5000 m - 7.07,19 - 15.02.2020 - Salt Lake City

Personal records

References

1998 births
Place of birth missing (living people)
Kazakhstani female speed skaters
Living people
Speed skaters at the 2017 Asian Winter Games
Speed skaters at the 2022 Winter Olympics
Olympic speed skaters of Kazakhstan
21st-century Kazakhstani women